An entertainment district is a type of arts district with a high concentration of movie theaters, theatres or other entertainment venues. Such areas may be officially designated by local governments with functional zoning regulations, as well as public and private investment in distinctive urban design.

Partial list of entertainment districts

 Las Vegas Strip, Las Vegas, Nevada
 Broadway (Nashville, Tennessee), Nashville, Tennessee
 San Antonio River Walk, San Antonio, Texas
 17 Avenue SW, Calgary, Canada
 Quartier des Spectacles, Montreal, Canada
 Calgary Entertainment District, Canada
 South Edmonton Common, Canada
 Ice District, Edmonton, Alberta
 Old Strathcona, Edmonton, Alberta
 Granville Entertainment District, Vancouver 
 Hohenzollernring, Cologne
 St. Pauli with Reeperbahn, Hamburg, Germany
 Bermudadreieck, Bochum, Germany
 Toronto Entertainment District, Canada
 Te Aro Entertainment District, Wellington, New Zealand
 Soho, London, England
 The O2, London, England
 Bukit Bintang, Kuala Lumpur, Malaysia
 Blok M, Jakarta, Indonesia
 Kings Cross, Sydney, Australia
 Kabukichō, Tokyo, Japan
 Shibuya, Tokyo, Japan
 Ikebukuro, Tokyo, Japan
 Shinjuku Ni-chōme, Tokyo, Japan
 Shinsaibashi, Osaka, Japan
 Sōemonchō, Osaka, Japan
 Amerikamura, Osaka, Japan
 Umeda, Osaka, Japan
 Dōyama-chō, Osaka, Japan
 Susukino, Sapporo, Japan
 Lan Kwai Fong, Hong Kong

Cause and effects of entertainment districts
Entertainment districts have economically helped downtowns and cities thrive through development of various businesses that attract tourism and commerce. As entertainment districts tend to create crowds, facilitation and management by police is required to promote safety and regulation. The main source that requires police interaction in the entertainment districts are the nightclubs and bars that may promote intoxication and lead to miscreant behavior. Police and security deal with behavior consisting of bar fights, overcrowding, and public urination. The requirement of regulation and maintenance of these areas are important for the safety of the individuals utilizing and benefiting from the entertainment districts.

See also 

 Amusement park
 Urban vitality

References

Neighbourhoods by type